The 2012–13 Belenenses season was the club's 95th competitive season, 5th in the Segunda Liga, and 95th year in existence as a football club.

Along with the club's participation in the Segunda Liga, the club also competed in the Taça de Portugal and Taça da Liga. On 30 March 2013, Belenenses won promotion back to the Primeira Liga, following a defeat over Penafiel. Belenenses' campaign was also most notable for several records, namely, most points accumulated during a single season (94).

Club
Coaching staff
{|class="wikitable"
|-
!Position
!Staff
|-
|Manager|| Mitchell van der Gaag
|-
|Assistant manager|| Jorge Simão
|-
|Technical director|| Rui Gregório
|-
|Goalkeeper Coach|| Luís Ferreira
|-
|Fitness Coach|| José Manuel Almeida
|-
|rowspan="2"|Scout|| João Janeiro
|-
| Rui Correia
|-
|Director of scouting|| Gonçalo Monteiro
|-Other information

First-team squad
Stats as of the end of the 2012–13 season. Games played and goals scored only refers to appearances and goals in domestic league campaigns.

Awards

Competitions

Legend

Overall

Competition record

Taça de Portugal

Matches

Statistics

Appearances

References

C.F. Os Belenenses seasons
Belenenses